Michael was the fourth Archbishop of Ohrid and Macedonia and once primate of the Macedonian Orthodox Church.

Archbishop Michael was born in Novo Selo, Ottoman Empire (present-day North Macedonia) in 1912. He had been a longstanding professor and dean at the theological faculty of the Ss. Cyril and Methodius University in Skopje before being elected as the leader of the Macedonian Orthodox Church on December 4, 1993.

Archbishop Michael died on July 6, 1999, and is remembered for his great oratory.

1912 births
1999 deaths
People from Štip Municipality
Archbishops of Ohrid and Macedonia
20th-century Eastern Orthodox archbishops
Eastern Orthodox Christians from North Macedonia
Academic staff of the Ss. Cyril and Methodius University of Skopje
20th-century people from the Ottoman Empire